Young-hoon, also spelled Young-hun or Yeong-hun, is a Korean masculine given name. Its meaning depends on the hanja used to write each syllable of the name. There are 34 hanja with the reading "young" and 12 hanja with the reading "hoon" on the South Korean government's official list of hanja which may be registered for use in given names.

People with this name include:

Entertainers
Joo Young-hoon (born 1969), South Korean singer, songwriter, and television personality
Kim Young-hoon (born 1978), South Korean actor
Lee Yeong-hoon (born 1982), South Korean actor

Sportspeople
Choi Young-hoon (born 1981), South Korean football forward (K-League Classic)
Cho Young-hun (born 1982), South Korean baseball first baseman
Cho Young-hoon (born 1989), South Korean football defender (K-League Challenge)

Other
Kang Young-hoon (born 1922), Prime Minister of South Korea from 1988 to 1990
Lee Young-hoon (born 1951), South Korean economist
Ko Young-hoon (born 1952), South Korean painter
Young Hoon Lee (pastor) (born 1954), South Korean pastor, senior pastor of Yoido Full Gospel Church
Lee Young-hoon (composer) (1960–2008), South Korean composer
Park Yeong-hun (born 1985), South Korean Go player

See also
List of Korean given names

References